Filip Andrzej Bobek (born 9 October 1980 in Gdańsk) is a Polish actor, best known for his role of the main love interest in BrzydUla.

He studied at the National Academy of Dramatic Art in Warsaw. He began his career by starring in short films of chemical experiments, included in school textbooks, and in an advertisement for the chocolate bar Prince Polo involving time travel to the People's Republic of Poland.

Filmography

Awards
Telekamery Award for Best Actor (2010)
Viva! Najpiękniejsi Award for Most Handsome Polish Man (2010)
Oskary Fashion Award for Best Dressed Polish Actor (2011)

References

1980 births
21st-century Polish male actors
Polish male television actors
Polish male film actors
Living people
Male actors from Gdańsk